Massimiliano Gallo (born 19 June 1968) is an Italian actor and singer.

Biography
Son of singer Nunzio Gallo, he made his debut in theater at the age of five and was already the star of several TV series for children shot for RAI. In 1988 he founded, together with his brother Gianfranco, the "Gallo Company", their theatrical company.

After more than 35 years on stage, Gallo debuted on movie screens in 2008, directed by his friend and colleague Vincenzo Salemme. In the following years, he worked with directors like Ferzan Özpetek, Marco Risi and Maria Sole Tognazzi. He also took part to Paolo Sorrentino's series The Young Pope.

In 2017 he gave his voice to the vicious druglord Salvatore Lo Giusto in the animated film Cinderella the Cat.

Selected filmography

Film
 
 Fort Apache Napoli (2009)
 Loose Cannons (2010)
 Mozzarella Stories (2011)
 Kryptonite! (2011)
 Magnificent Presence (2012)
 Perez. (2014)
 Si accettano miracoli (2015)
 Me, Myself and Her (2015)
 Per amor vostro (2015)
 Cinderella the Cat (2017)
 Reckless (2018)
 The Mayor of Rione Sanità (2019)

TV
 Un caso di coscienza (2013)
 The Young Pope, episode 01x06 (2016)

References

External links
 

1968 births
Living people
Male actors from Naples
Italian male film actors
Italian male singers
21st-century Italian male actors